Justin Cameron McMaster (born June 30, 1999) is a professional footballer who plays as a winger. Born in the United States, he represents the Jamaica national team.

Club career
He made his professional debut for Bethlehem Steel FC during the 2016 USL season against Charlotte Independence in June 2016.

McMaster was drafted 17th overall by Minnesota United in the 2021 MLS SuperDraft. He signed with the club on 3 April 2021. Following the 2022 season, his contract option was declined by Minnesota.

International career

Youth
McMaster represented Jamaica during the 2013 CONCACAF Under-15 Championship and the 2015 CONCACAF U-17 Championship qualifying tournament. He scored four goals against U.S. Virgin Islands in a 19–0 victory.

Senior
In November 2022, McMaster received a call-up to the Jamaican senior team for a friendly against Cameroon. McMaster scored his first senior international goal against Cameroon.

International goals

Career statistics

College

Club

References

External links

1999 births
Living people
Philadelphia Union II players
Jamaican footballers
Jamaican expatriate footballers
Expatriate soccer players in the United States
USL Championship players
Association football forwards
Wake Forest Demon Deacons men's soccer players
Minnesota United FC draft picks
Minnesota United FC players
Soccer players from Pennsylvania
Sportspeople from Montgomery County, Pennsylvania
Major League Soccer players
MLS Next Pro players